The Forti FG03 was the car with which the Forti team competed in part of the  Formula One season. It was designed by Chris Radage and Riccardo de Marco. It was driven by Luca Badoer and Andrea Montermini, both of whom were in their first year with the team.

Introduced at Imola, it was a major step forward in terms of downforce and sensitivity; however, it only finished once, at its debut race, and both drivers failed to make the 107% time for the Spanish and British Grands Prix. Ultimately, the FG03 was too little, too late, and Forti folded at the German GP.

The team came last in the Constructors' Championship, with no points.

A FG03 is currently used for F1 experiences in Northamptonshire. The car also competed in the BOSS GP Series in 2016, 2018 and 2019.

Complete Formula One results
(key)

References

Forti Formula One cars
1996 Formula One season cars